The Chinese Ambassador to Nigeria is the official representative of the People's Republic of China to Nigeria.

List of representatives

See also
China–Nigeria relations

References 

Ambassadors of China to Nigeria
Nigeria
China